Gore Hall was a historic building on the Harvard University campus in Cambridge, Massachusetts, designed by Richard Bond. Harvard's first dedicated library building, a Gothic structure built in 1838 of Quincy granite, it was named in honor of Harvard graduate and Massachusetts Governor Christopher Gore.

When, in 1846, Harvard President Edward Everett was asked to design a seal for the newly incorporated City of Cambridge, he made Gore one of two icons (the other being the Washington Elm) encircled by the motto Literis Antiquis Novis Institutis Decora. "It can be translated as: 'Distinguished for Classical Learning and New Institutions.

When the original Gore Hall was demolished in 1913 to make way for Widener Library,
its name was transferred to a new Gore Hall, a freshman dormitory then under construction and now part of Winthrop House.

References

https://archive.today/20150224033933/http://portal-gss.lib.harvard.edu/01092015-1907/history-harvards-library-one-spine-time

External links
 Text gives locations of three other pinnacles salvaged from Gore Hall.

Harvard University buildings
Demolished buildings and structures in Massachusetts
Buildings and structures demolished in 1913